The 2003 Upper Austrian state election was held on 28 September 2003 to elect the members of the Landtag of Upper Austria.

The governing Austrian People's Party (ÖVP) remained the largest party in the face of a strong performance from the Social Democratic Party of Austria (SPÖ). The Freedom Party of Austria (FPÖ), which had won over 20% in the previous election, lost more than half its vote share and fell to 8%; most of this flowed to the SPÖ. The FPÖ also lost both its state councillors. The Greens became the third largest party and won their first state councillor in Upper Austria. As the ÖVP and SPÖ won four each, the Greens held balance of power in the state government.

The ÖVP under Governor Josef Pühringer signed a working agreement with the Greens. This was the first ever ÖVP–Green coalition formed on a state level.

Background
The Upper Austrian constitution mandates that cabinet positions in the state government (state councillors) be allocated between parties proportionally in accordance with the share of votes won by each; this is known as Proporz. As such, the government is a perpetual coalition of all parties that qualify for at least one state councillor. Despite this, parties still establish formal coalitions to organise cabinet positions and ensure a Landtag majority for legislative purposes.

In the 1997 state election, the ÖVP and SPÖ suffered minor losses to the FPÖ and Greens, the latter of which entered the Landtag for the first time. The ÖVP won four state councillors, the SPÖ three, and the FPÖ two.

Electoral system
The 56 seats of the Landtag of Upper Austria are elected via open list proportional representation in a two-step process. The seats are distributed between five multi-member constituencies. For parties to receive any representation in the Landtag, they must either win at least one seat in a constituency directly, or clear a 4 percent state-wide electoral threshold. Seats are distributed in constituencies according to the Hare quota, with any remaining seats allocated using the D'Hondt method at the state level, to ensure overall proportionality between a party's vote share and its share of seats.

Contesting parties
The table below lists parties represented in the previous Landtag.

In addition to the parties already represented in the Landtag, one party collected enough signatures to be placed on the ballot.

 Communist Party of Austria (KPÖ)

Results

Results by constituency

References

Upper Austrian state election
State elections in Austria
Upper Austrian state election
Upper Austria